Choorian ( meaning "Bangles") is a 1998 Pakistani Punjabi language action romantic film, directed by Syed Noor and produced by Haji Faqir Mohammad. The film stars Moammar Rana, Saima and Nargis in leading roles. Choorian is one of Pakistan’s highest-grossing films of all time.

The film has a simple love story. A city boy Bakhtu (Moammar Rana) is sent to live with his uncle back in the village. He soon falls in love with his uncle's older daughter Billo (Saima). Billo is like a servant in her own home, and does all the chores which are overseen by Bahar, her stepmother. Bahar treats her like a slave throughout the movie while her two daughters live like queens.
The movie was produced in the village of Jia Bagga.

Plot 
Bakhtu (Moammar Rana) is a young man living in the city. He is repeatedly involved in fights to defend the honour of women to the point that his mother, Rashida fears for his life. She is afraid that he will become like his father, who became a murderer, or be killed. She begs her brother to help her since Bakhtu does not listen to her. He takes Bakhtu to his village. Bakhtu is instantly enamoured with his cousin and childhood friend, Billo (Saima Noor). She is ill-treated by her stepmother and stepsisters and does all the work. She is uneducated while her stepsisters have passed Grade 10. Bakhtu's aunt, Bahar Begum, is interested in him for Sammiya, her own daughter, who has expressed her interest in him. Billo prevents Bakhtu from fighting with Makha Natt when he finds out that he has a habit of ogling her.

Sammiya tries to win him over, but Bakhtu is uninterested and confesses his love to Billo. They try to keep their growing relationship a secret, but Sammiya notices and feels threatened. She tells Bakhtu she loves him and tries to entice him by dancing for him in the rain. He is upset by her behaviour and when she keeps touching him he finally slaps her. Sammiya points out Billo holding hands with Bakhtu to Bahar, when they go to a carnival and disappear. When the couple returns, they are confronted by the family. Billo is accused of having a loose character. Bakhtu loses his temper and calls his aunt a 'churail' (witch) and declares that her daughter (Sammiya) is the same as her. His uncle beats him and kicks him out of the house. Bakhtu declares that no one will ever be able to separate him and Billo and leaves. Billo sneaks away and brings Bakhtu food. He brings her home, but the couple is caught by Sammiya. Bakhtu's uncle orders Bakhtu to leave the village if he cares at all for his honour. He refuses, saying he would rather die.

His uncle journeys to the city to beg Rashida to take her son back before he shames him before the village. Meanwhile, Bahar Begum is fixing Billo's engagement with Makha Natt. Rashida begs Bakhtu to leave and he cannot refuse. As Bakhtu leaves, Billo runs after him and breaks her bangles, she is heartbroken. She is too late and watches his train leave. She is forcefully engaged to Natt.

Bakhtu cannot bear the separation from Billo and sneaks away in the night. He arrives armed to apply mehndi (henna) to Billo's hands before Chaudhry's name can be written on them. He promises to marry her in two days' time. He is confronted by Makha Natt and his men. Bakhtu kills many of them and is wounded as well. He has a chance to kill Makha, but leaves him alive so that he can marry Billo. He himself disappears.

On the day of Billo's wedding to Makha, Sammiya asks her why she is smiling. She tells Billo that Bakhtu was killed by Makha Natt. She replies that she knows that Bakhtu will come to marry her. Bakhtu arrives on horseback to take his bride. The 'maulvi' and witnesses arrive to solemnise the marriage. Bahar Begum refuses to allow it, claiming that he cannot marry her without her permission. Billo's father has a change of heart and gives his permission, blessing her. Bakhtu's mother arrives as well. The couple is married as Bahar Begum waits for Makha Natt and his men to arrive. Sammiya seats her sister on the horse with her husband and sends her off wishing her happiness. They narrowly escape Natt as Billo's father stands in their way, taking on the cavalry singlehandedly. Bahar Begum is killed in the firing.

The men catch up to Bakhtu and Billo in the forest. Bakhtu shoots many down, but is wounded. The situation appears hopeless until his uncle arrives, joining the fray. Bakhtu's uncle is severely wounded by Natt before Bakhtu kills him. He blesses the couple, asking them not to leave the village and to care for his family before he dies in their arms.

Cast 
 Moammar Rana as Bakhtu
 Saima Noor as Billo
 Muzaffar Adeeb
 Bahar Begum
 Babar Butt
 Shafqat Cheema
Sardar Kamal
 Abid Khan
 Irfan Khoosat
 Nargis
 Azhar Rangeela
 Deeba
 Naghma

Soundtrack 

The music rights of the movie were internationally acquired by Warner Music.

Awards

Box office 

Choorian opened in 22 cinemas across Pakistan and earned a total of ₨.200 million in its one-year run.
Choorian became the third highest-grossing film on 23 November 2013 after the record was broken by Waar and Khuda Kay Liye.

See also
 List of highest-grossing Pakistani films
 List of Pakistani films of 1998

References

External links 
 

1998 films
Punjabi-language Pakistani films
1998 romantic comedy films
Films directed by Syed Noor
1990s Punjabi-language films
Nigar Award winners
Pakistani romantic comedy films